Bazgir (also Romanized as Bāzgīr) is a village in Qaleh Rural District, in the Central District of Manujan County, Kerman Province, Iran. At the 2006 census, its population was 61, in 13 families.

References 

Populated places in Manujan County